Senator Gudger may refer to:

Garlan Gudger (fl. 2010s), Alabama State Senate
James M. Gudger Jr. (1855–1920), North Carolina State Senate
V. Lamar Gudger (1919–2004), North Carolina State Senate